Angora Lake is a lake located on Vancouver Island between arms of Kennedy Lake north of Ucluelet.

See also
List of lakes of British Columbia

References

Clayoquot Sound region
Lakes of Vancouver Island
Clayoquot Land District